Hal Cumpston is an Australian actor, producer and writer.

Early life 
Cumpston grew up in Sydney and attended an all-boys school where he was heavily involved in drama. Both of his parents work in the film Industry. His father Jeremy Cumpston, is a doctor and a Western Australian Academy of Performing Arts graduate who founded the Old Fitzroy Theatre and has appeared in shows such as All Saints. His mother Rachel Lane, is a nonfiction producer-director. Cumpston is of indigenous Australian Barkandji heritage through his fathers' maternal line.

In Cumpston's final year of school, he was shortlisted for "OnStage", which recognises excellence for high school drama performances. Cumpston was also chosen as a state finalist in the highly competitive Australian Class Clowns stand up comedy competition.

Career 
After returning from Schoolies week, Cumpston wrote the screenplay for a teen comedy called "Bilched" that his father helped fund and direct. His high school friends Ewen and James helped co-produce, and he called in his younger brothers and friends as part of the cast alongside bigger names like comedian Alex Williamson and Rhys Muldoon. Cumpston wanted to make an Australian comedy teen movie because he felt there weren't any good ones. In three days he had written 34 pages and in less than a fortnight he had a first draft. In 2018, the film was shot in 21 days in Sydney's eastern suburbs. In the following year Cumpston completed the post-production. The plot follows protagonist Hal, who auditions for a drama school but is told his performance is not honest. "Bilched" was Cumpston's first project and received a national release in Australia and at the 2019 Chelsea Film Festival, it won the award for Best Screenplay, Best Supporting Actor (Fred Du Rietz) and the Grand Prix Best Feature Film.

Three weeks after production on "Bilched" wrapped, Cumpston received his first American audition via an email that came from an American Talent Agency Industry Entertainment. He wasn't sure that it was real, but it turned out that actress Jenni Baird, had seen an article in a magazine featuring the Cumpston's and her partner, writer-director Michael Petroni, knew someone in an American casting office and put in a call. Cumpston embodied the brief needed for Silas in The Walking Dead: World Beyond, and recorded a video audition that propelled him forward in the casting process. Eventually Cumpston won the role and portrays a teen making his way through an eerily familiar world changed forever by the outcome of a global pandemic. Filming took place in Richmond, Virginia.

In 2021, Cumpston played Zachary, the dead son of the Marconi family in the series Nine Perfect Strangers alongside Nicole Kidman, Asher Keddie and Melissa McCarthy. The series is based on a Liane Moriarty book and centres around a group of people at a health retreat trying to find a path to a better life but are met with dilemmas.

Cumpston is currently working on writing more comedy movies. He is inspired by Seth Rogen, Quentin Tarantino and Evan Goldberg.

References 

Living people
1999 births
Australian male film actors
Australian male television actors
Australian screenwriters
Indigenous Australian male actors